The Ministry of Education is the ministry of the Government of Ontario responsible for government policy, funding, curriculum planning and direction in all levels of public education, including elementary and secondary schools.

The ministry is responsible for curriculum and guidelines for all officially recognized elementary and secondary schools in the province and some outside the province. The ministry is also responsible for public and separate school boards across Ontario, but are not involved in the day-to-day operations.

The current minister of education is Stephen Lecce. A number of ministers of education have gone on to become premier of Ontario, including Arthur Sturgis Hardy, George Ross, George Drew, John Robarts, Bill Davis, and Kathleen Wynne.

History

Prior to Confederation, the supervision of the education system and the development of education policy of Canada West were the responsibilities of the Department of Public Instruction. Founded in 1850, the department was headed by the chief superintendent of education, Egerton Ryerson, and reported to the Executive Council and the Legislative Assembly

In February 1876, the Department of Public Instruction was replaced by the Department of Education. The new department was presided over by the minister of education who was assigned the powers formerly held by the chief superintendent of education. 

Responsibilities for post-secondary education were part of the department's portfolio prior to 1964 when the Department of University Affairs was created. The Department of Education continued to be responsible for post-secondary education in applied arts and technology until 1971 when the responsibility was transferred to the renamed Department of Colleges and Universities. 

In 1972, the Department of Education was renamed the Ministry of Education. The ministry again oversaw post-secondary education between 1993 and 1999.

Reports

Hall-Dennis Report, 1968

The Hall-Dennis Report, officially titled Living and Learning, called for broad reforms to Ontario education, to empower teachers and the larger community, and put students' needs and dignity at the centre of education.

Fullan Report, 2013

The Fullan Report, officially titled Great to Excellent, calls for a focus on the 6 C's: Character, Citizenship, Communication, Critical thinking and problem solving, Collaboration and teamwork, and Creativity and imagination. The report also calls for innovation in how these areas are learned.

List of Ministers of education

Approach to discipline

Ontario public schools use progressive discipline. Discipline is corrective and supportive rather than punitive, with a focus on prevention and early intervention. It is a whole-school, systemic approach, engaging students, families and the larger community, as well as classes, schools and boards. Schools are to recognize and respect the diversity of parent communities, and partner with them accordingly. Students are surveyed at least every two years about their experience of the school climate.

"For students with special education needs, interventions, supports, and consequences must be consistent with the student’s strengths and needs".

While the school principal is responsible for discipline, all board employees who come into contact with students are responsible for stepping in if inappropriate behaviour occurs. The principal may also delegate powers and duties related to discipline.

Ministry Agencies 

 Association Des Enseignants Franco-Ontariens (AEFO) Employee Life and Health Trust
 Council of the College of Early Childhood Educators 
 Council of The Ontario College of Teachers 
 Cupe Education Workers' Benefits Trust
 Education Quality and Accountability Office 
 Education Relations Commission 
 Elementary Teachers' Federation of Ontario (ETFO) Employee Life and Health Trust 
 Languages of Instruction Commission of Ontario 
 Ministers' Advisory Council On Special Education 
 Ontario Educational Communications Authority (TVO)
 Ontario English Catholic Teachers' Association (OECTA) Employee Life and Health Trust 
 TFO
 Ontario Non-Union Teachers' Trust
 Ontario Teachers' Pension Plan Board 
 OSSTF Employee Life and Health Trust 
 Provincial Schools Authority

See also

 Education in Ontario
 Ministry of Colleges and Universities 
 List of school districts in Ontario

References

External links
 Ministry of Education
 Biography of the Minister of Education
 

Education
1999 establishments in Ontario
Ontario
Education in Ontario 
Ontario, Education